Marquard is a small farming town in South Africa.

Marquard may also refer to:
As last name
Jürg Marquard (born 1945), Swiss journalist and businessman
Odo Marquard (1928–2015), German philosopher
Rube Marquard (1886–1980), American pitcher  in Major League Baseball

As first name
Marquard Bohm (1941–2006), German actor.
Marquard Gude (1635–1689), German archaeologist and classical scholar
Marquard Herrgott (1694–1762), German Benedictine historian and diplomat
Marquard Schwarz (1887–1968), American freestyle swimmer
Marquard Sebastian von Schenk von Stauffenberg (1644–1693), Prince-Bishop of Bamberg

As a single name
Marquard of Randeck (1296–1381), Patriarch of Aquileia
Marquard von Berg (1528–1591), Prince-Bishop of Augsburg
Marquard von Salzbach (d.1410), Teutonic Knight

See also
Marquand (disambiguation)
Marquardt